T-box transcription factor Tbx4 is a transcription factor that belongs to T-box gene family that is involved in the regulation of embryonic developmental processes. The transcription factor is encoded by the TBX4 gene located on human chromosome 17. Tbx4 is known mostly for its role in the development of the hindlimb, but it also plays a critical role in the formation of the umbilicus. Tbx4 has been shown to be expressed in the allantois, hindlimb, lung and proctodeum.

Function 

Expression of Tbx4 is activated by a combined "caudal" Hox code, expressing a specified positional code that includes Pitx1 gene expression. The encoded protein plays a major role in limb development, specifically during limb bud initiation. For instance, in chickens Tbx4 specifies hindlimb status. The activation of Tbx4 and other T-box proteins by Hox genes activates signaling cascades that involve the Wnt signaling pathway and FGF signals in limb buds. Ultimately, Tbx4 leads to the development of apical ectodermal ridge (AER) and zone of polarizing activity (ZPA) signaling centers in the developing limb bud, which specify the orientation growth of the developing limb. Together with Tbx5, Tbx4 plays a role in patterning the soft tissues (muscles and tendons) of the musculoskeletal system.

Mutations 

Duplication of the 17q23.1–q23.2 region, which includes the TBX4 gene, has been reported to result in congenital clubfoot. TBX4 duplication within this region has been determined to be the gene that leads to this phenotype.

Loss-of-function TBX4  mutations lead to an autosomal-dominant disorder called small patella syndrome, also known as Scott-Taor syndrome, which is characterized by patellar aplasia and abnormalities of the pelvis and feet. The loss of both parental copies of TBX4, resulting in a complete knockout, was reported by Bruno Reversade and colleagues to result in the total loss of hind limbs in human fetuses. This fatal syndrome is known as posterior amelia with pelvic and pulmonary hypoplasia syndrome (PAPPAS).
 
Mutations in the TBX4 that cause small patella syndrome are also associated with childhood-onset pulmonary arterial hypertension (PAH). Deletion of 17q23.2 (which includes the TBX4 gene) or a point mutation in the TBX4 gene is reported in 30% of patients with childhood-onset PAH, whereas TBX4 gene mutations are associated with low frequency in adult-onset PAH patients (2%).

Using targeted mutagenesis of Tbx4 in the mouse, various abnormalities were observed in the development of the allantois. Choirioallantoic fusion fails to occur in embryos with the homozygous null allele resulting in death 10.5 days post coitus, embryos with the Tbx4-mutant gene were observed to have allantoises that were apoptotic, stunted, and displayed abnormal differentiation with endothelial cells resulting in the absence of vascular remodeling.

Role
Tbx4 is a transcription factor and member of the T-box family, which have been shown to play important role in fetal development. Tbx4 is expressed in a wide variety of tissues during organogenesis, including the hindlimb, proctodeum, mandibular mesenchyme, lung mesenchyme, atrium of the heart and the body wall. Tbx4 is specifically expressed in the visceral mesoderm of the lung primordium and governs multiple processes during respiratory tract development such as initial endodermal bud development, respiratory endoderm formation, and septation of the respiratory tract and esophagus. Along with Tbx4, Tbx5 is also expressed to help with development of limbs. Tbx4 is expressed in the hindlimb, whereas Tbx5 is expressed in the forelimb, heart, and dorsal side of the retina. Studies have shown that fibroblast growth factor (FGF) play a key role in limb initiation. In a developing embryo a gradient of retinoic acid aids in the combinatorial patterns of Hox gene expression along the body axis, which causes regions of the paraxial mesoderm to emit a signal to the lateral mesoderm that causes the expression of Tbx4 and Tbx5. When these two molecules are expressed that stimulate the secretion of FGF-10, which will induce the ectoderm to produce FGF-8. FGF-8 and FGF-10 together promote limb development. Mutations or teratogens that interfere with Tbx4/Tbx5 or FGF-8/FGF-10 has the ability to cause a child to be born without one or more limbs. A common syndrome seen with a mutation these genes is Tetra-Amelia syndrome which is characterized by the absence of all four limbs and anomalies involving the cranium and the face; eyes; urogenital system; heart; lungs and central nervous system. In a study done by Naiche et al. they generated a knockout mouse in which it lacked the expression on Tbx4 this mouse resulted in a phenotype of no limb formation.

References

Transcription factors